The North Dakota Department of Corrections and Rehabilitation (DOCR) provides prison services for the state of North Dakota.  The Division of Field Services supervises parolees through 14 field offices. DOCR also has a Division of Juvenile Services providing supervision and case management of delinquent youth of the state. The agency has its headquarters in Bismarck.

The director of the North Dakota Department of Corrections and Rehabilitation is 
Dave Krabbenhoft.

Facilities

The department has four different adult prisons in the state of North Dakota Below:

 605 inmates at North Dakota State Penitentiary - Bismarck
 417 inmates at James River Correctional Center - Jamestown
 162 inmates at Dakota Women's Correctional and Rehabilitation Center - New England
 89 inmates at Missouri River Correctional Center - Bismarck

Division of Juvenile Services

The Division of Juvenile Services (DJS) provides juvenile correctional services. The agency operates the North Dakota Youth Correctional Center and maintains eight regional community offices. The North Dakota Youth Correctional Center is partially in Mandan and partially in unincorporated Morton County.

The housing units include:
 Brown Cottage - 16 beds - for females
 Hickory Cottage - 35 beds - for males
 Pine Cottage - 25 beds - for males

Brown Cottage - Brown Cottage is a 16-bed structure housing female juveniles for Detention, Assessment and Treatment.

Hickory Cottage - Hickory Cottage is a 35-bed structure housing male treatment status juveniles. A Mental Health Specialist, a Nurse Practitioner, a dentist office, nurse's offices and a medical examination room is located on the lower level of Hickory Cottage. An Intensive Outpatient Drug and Alcohol Treatment Program is also located on the lower level of this cottage.

Pine Cottage - Pine Cottage is a 25-bed structure housing male juveniles. Cottage staff provide a variety of programs including Assessment, Detention, Time Out, and Special Management. Additionally, this cottage houses high risk or high maintenance male juveniles. It also serves as the intake cottage for all new male admissions.

Fallen officers
Since the establishment of the North Dakota Department of Corrections and Rehabilitation, two officers have died in the line of duty.

Reform 
In 2015, several North Dakota legislators, judges and prison officials flew to Norway and visited Halden Prison. Halden is often called the "most humane prison in the world" and was visited to see how to reform North Dakota state prisons to lower recidivism rates and decrease the number of fights in their prisons. North Dakota's DOC has since established softball fields and encouraged vocational training for prisoners at North Dakota State Penitentiary. Solitary confinement has been reduced to only be a few days at a time rather than a maximum time in solitary of a year

See also
 List of United States state correction agencies
 List of law enforcement agencies in North Dakota
 Prison

References

External links
DOCR website
Rough Rider Industries website

State corrections departments of the United States
State law enforcement agencies of North Dakota
Juvenile detention centers in the United States